This is a list of cemeteries in the York Region of Ontario, Canada.

Active cemeteries includes religion affiliated or non-denominational.

Abandoned cemeteries are managed by the municipalities they are located in. In some cases where graves are no longer found or missing markers are added to identify their previous usage. Some abandoned cemeteries were once attached to a church which has either closed or burned down.

Smaller formerly religion affiliated cemeteries are now non-denominational with many maintain municipally.

There are 11 known First Nations sites in York Region with 3 confirmed mass graves of ossuary used to bury the dead from former villages.

See also
 List of cemeteries in Toronto

References

External links 
 List of active cemeteries in Markhsm
 List of Municipally Licensed and Owned Cemeteries | City of Markham
 

 
Cemeteries
York